3 Hudson Boulevard (previously known as GiraSole) is a skyscraper on hold along the Hudson Park and Boulevard in the Hudson Yards and Hell's Kitchen neighborhoods of Manhattan, New York City. Its developer is Joseph Moinian.

History and development
FXFOWLE Architects designed the building, which is planned to have  of real estate.

Construction was supposed to begin in mid-2014 or 2015, with the building's completion planned for 2017. Completion was rescheduled for 2022. The building, directly across Eleventh Avenue from the Jacob K. Javits Convention Center, would abut the secondary entrance to the new 34th Street – Hudson Yards subway station, built as part of the New York City Subway's 7 Subway Extension project. Consequently, the foundation was built by the Metropolitan Transportation Authority because the subway station is directly underneath; the rest of the building would be built by Moinian Group. The foundation works started May 2016. A groundbreaking ceremony was held November 3, 2017.

On June 26, 2014, Joseph Moinian secured a loan for the construction of the building. In addition, Joseph Moinian sought $3 billion in debt and equity to fund the tower.

In an interview with Commercial Observer, Ted Koltis of The Moinian Group said the firm had begun "speculative" construction of the project in early 2022. However, in late 2022 New York YIMBY reported that construction on the building was on hold.

Energy efficiency
The developers of the building are hoping to get a LEED Platinum certification for the building when it is completed, owing to its eco-friendly design. "Green" strategies include wind harvesting, rooftop farming, heat recovery, solar shading, photovoltaic electricity, regenerative elevators, Energy Star-efficient appliances, ice storage, and natural lighting.

Floors
The top two floors are set aside for a conference center, or executive or cafeteria dining. The office building will also include  of retail.

See also
List of tallest buildings in New York City

References

External links

Moinian: 3 Hudson Boulevard
FXFOWLE: 3 Hudson Boulevard

Skyscraper office buildings in Manhattan
Buildings and structures under construction in the United States
Hudson Yards, Manhattan
Hell's Kitchen, Manhattan
Eleventh Avenue (Manhattan)